The  is a deluxe sleeping car excursion train operated by Kyushu Railway Company (JR Kyushu) in Japan since October 2013.

Design
The overall design concept of the train was overseen by industrial designer Eiji Mitooka. The name of the train is derived from the seven prefectures of Kyushu and the fact that the train is made up of seven cars.

The dedicated diesel locomotive, DF200-7000, for the train was built by Kawasaki Heavy Industries in Kobe, based on the JR Freight Class DF200 locomotive, modified for use in Kyushu and finished in a livery of deep maroon. It was completed in July 2013. The coaches are based on the 817 series EMU body design and are mounted on 787 series EMU bogies. Manufacture of the passenger coaches was split between Hitachi in Kudamatsu, Yamaguchi, and JR Kyushu's Kokura Works in Kitakyushu.

Train formation
The train consists of the DF200-7000 locomotive and seven coaches: five sleeping cars, a lounge car, and a dining car, with a total capacity of 28 passengers. The rear car of the train features two deluxe suites with observation windows at the end. All suites have their own toilets and shower facilities, designed in porcelain by the late Sakaida Kakiemon XIV. The total cost of building the train was approximately 3 billion yen.

The train is formed as follows.

Route

The train operates on two-day and four-day circular tours of Kyushu, starting and finishing at Hakata Station. Coach tours are provided from various stations along the route.

2-day itinerary
Day 1  → 
Day 2  →  → Hakata

4-day itinerary
Day 1  →  
Day 2  →  → 
Day 3  →  → 
Day 4  →  → Hakata

History

The dedicated Class DF200-7000 diesel locomotive for this train was delivered to JR Kyushu's Oita Depot from the Kawasaki Heavy Industries Rolling Stock Company in Kobe on 2 July 2013. Four coaches were delivered from Hitachi's Kudamatsu factory on 18 July 2013. The train entered revenue service on 15 October 2013.

See also
 List of named passenger trains of Japan
 Joyful Train, the generic name for excursion and charter trains in Japan
 Cassiopeia, a luxury sleeping car train operated by JR East in Japan
 Twilight Express Mizukaze, a luxury sleeping car excursion train operated by JR West in Japan
 Train Suite Shiki-shima, a luxury sleeping car excursion train operated by JR East in Japan

References

Further reading

External links

 

Named passenger trains of Japan
Kyushu Railway Company
Railway services introduced in 2013
Railway coaches of Japan
2013 establishments in Japan
Luxury trains